The funeral of Alija Izetbegović, the first Chairman of the Presidency of Bosnia and Herzegovina, was held on 22 October 2003, three days after his death on 19 October in Sarajevo, Bosnia and Herzegovina. His funeral drew many Bosnian officials, dignitaries from 44 foreign countries, 105 members of the Grand National Assembly of Turkey and between 100,000 and 150,000 people, with his family receiving over 4,000 telegrams. Over 400 journalists attended the funeral as it was broadcast live on TV with 37 cameras.

Izetbegović died on 19 October 2003 of heart disease complicated by injuries suffered from a fall at home. An ICTY investigation of Izetbegović was in progress, but ended with his death. Following his death there was an initiative to rename a part of the main street of Sarajevo from Ulica Maršala Tita (Marshal Tito Street) and the Sarajevo International Airport in his honor. Following objections from politicians from Republika Srpska, the international community, and UN envoy Paddy Ashdown, both initiatives failed.

On 11 August 2006, Izetbegović's grave at the Kovači cemetery in Sarajevo was badly damaged by a bomb. The identity of the bomber or bombers has never been determined.

Reactions
Following Izetbegović's death, many world leaders were saddened to hear the news, including former US president Bill Clinton and US general and former US presidential candidate Wesley Clark, French president Jacques Chirac, Secretary-General of the Council of the European Union Javier Solana, Secretary-General of the United Nations Kofi Annan, Italian president Carlo Azeglio Ciampi, Secretary General of NATO George Robertson, Prime Minister of Turkey Recep Tayyip Erdoğan, Croatian president and prime minister Stjepan Mesić and Ivica Račan and many others.

References

External links

Funeral
Izetbegović, Alija
Izetbegović, Alija
Izetbegović, Alija
Izetbegović, Alija
2000s in Sarajevo
Events in Sarajevo
October 2003 events in Europe
2003 in Bosnia and Herzegovina
2003 in politics